Neptunea heros, common name : the heros neptune, is a species of sea snail, a marine gastropod mollusk in the family Buccinidae, the true whelks.

Description
(Original description by J.E. Gray) The size of an adult shell varies between 60 mm and 175 mm. The elongate shell has a conical shape longer than the aperture. The whorls are convex. The two or three upper whorls have a strong central keel. The rest show irregularly placed distant rounder tubercles. The body whorl is rounded, not keeled. The inside of the aperture is white.

The erect egg-cases are ovate-oblong, on an expanded base and contracted beneath. The granular surface is deeply punctated.

The white, opaque, outer coat of the shell is very much inclined to separate from the inner or central coat, which presents, where the outer coat is removed, a smooth surface of yellowish or brown colour.

Distribution
This species is distributed in the Northwest Atlantic Ocean and along Canada; it is also circum-Arctic and can be found along Japan and Korea

References

 MacGinitie N. (1959) Marine Mollusca of Point Barrow, Alaska. Proceedings of the United States National Museum 109: 59–208. [Published 18 September 1959] page(s): 124
 Brunel, P., L. Bosse, and G. Lamarche. 1998. Catalogue of the marine invertebrates of the estuary and Gulf of St. Lawrence. Canadian Special Publication of Fisheries and Aquatic Sciences, 126. 405 p.

External links
 Gastropods.com : Neptunea (Rugosa-group) heros; accessed : 26 April 2011

Buccinidae
Gastropods described in 1850
Taxa named by John Edward Gray